Nay Eretra Sämunawi Gazét'a ('Eritrean Weekly News') was a Tigrinya-language newspaper published in Eritrea. The newspaper, which was founded in 1942 (during the British Mandate period), was issued by the British Information Service. The newspaper was closed down in 1953, when the Ethiopian imperial government banned all Eritrean publications.

References

Tigrinya-language newspapers
Newspapers published in Eritrea
Newspapers established in 1942
Publications disestablished in 1953
1942 establishments in the British Empire